Rafaël Ouellet is a Canadian screenwriter and film director from Dégelis, Quebec. He is most noted for his 2012 film Camion, for which he received Jutra Award nominations for Best Director, Best Screenplay and Best Editing at the 15th Jutra Awards in 2013.

He launched his career as a cameraman, editor and director for MusiquePlus from 1998 to 2004. He received a Juno Award nomination for Music DVD of the Year at the Juno Awards of 2004, for his work on Our Lady Peace's concert DVD Our Lady Peace Live in Alberta. He then directed episodes of the television series Le Groulx Luxe and Canadian Case Files, and was the editor of Denis Côté's 2005 film Drifting States (Les États nordiques), before releasing his debut feature film, Mona's Daughters (Le cèdre penché), in 2007.

His newest film, Family Game (Arsenault et fils), entered the production process in 2020. It was shot in Ouellet's hometown, and was released in 2022.

Filmography

Film
 Mona's Daughters (Le Cèdre penché) - 2007
 Behind Me (Derrière moi) - 2008
 New Denmark - 2009
 Camion - 2012
 Finissant(e)s - 2013
 Gurov and Anna (Gurov et Anna) - 2015
 Family Game (Arsenault et fils) - 2022

Television
 Le Groulx Luxe - 2003
 Canadian Case Files - 2005
 The Phoenix Sessions - 2006
 Pendant ce temps, devant la télé - 2007
 La vie nous arrive - 2012
 Nouvelle adresse - 2014
 Blue Moon - 2018
 Cheval Serpent - 2018
 Ruptures - 2018
 Virage - 2023

Music DVDs
 Our Lady Peace: Live in Alberta - 2003
 Our Lady Peace: Decade - 2006
 Loose: The Concert (Nelly Furtado) - 2007

References

External links

21st-century Canadian screenwriters
21st-century Canadian male writers
Canadian screenwriters in French
Canadian television directors
Canadian music video directors
Film directors from Quebec
Writers from Quebec
French Quebecers
People from Bas-Saint-Laurent
Living people
Canadian film editors
Year of birth missing (living people)